John Willis, (ca. 1575 – 28 November 1625) was a British clergyman, stenographer and mnemonician. He developed a simple style of shorthand based on the work by Timothy Bright.

Early life
Willis graduated from Christ's College, Cambridge, in 1592.

Clergyman and later life
On 12 June 1601 he was admitted to the rectory of St. Mary Bothaw, Dowgate Hill, London. He resigned in 1606 on being appointed rector of Bentley Parva, Essex.

Shorthand
In 1602 he published The Art of Stenographie, which was a new and more practicable system to capture speech in short writing. His shorthand was based on a system of arbitrary equivalent symbols, one for each single letter of the alphabet.

Works
 The Art of Stenographie, London, 1602

References

Attribution

1570s births
1625 deaths
16th-century English writers
16th-century male writers
17th-century English Anglican priests
17th-century English writers
17th-century English male writers
Shorthand systems
English male writers